Vladimir Prison, popularly known as Vladimir Central, is a prison in Vladimir, Russia. It is the largest prison in Russia, with a capacity of 1220 detainees, and is operated by the Federal Penitentiary Service as a maximum-security prison with most inmates serving a minimum of ten years to life sentences.

History

Vladimir Prison was established by the Russian Empire in 1783 by decree of Empress Catherine II, located about 160 kilometres (100 mi) northeast of Moscow. In 1906, it became known as Vladimir Central and contained political prisoners. At the beginning of 1921, shortly after the rise of the Bolsheviks to power, Vladimir Central became the first of several special-purpose prisons, politisolators, intended to incarcerate far-left opponents of the regime. 

Vladimir Central was later part of the system of "special camps and prisons" organized on the basis of the USSR Council of Ministers resolution No. 416-159 of February 21, 1948 "On the organization of the Ministry of Internal Affairs camps with a strict regime for keeping particularly dangerous state criminals". The resolution widened the range of political prisoners for the detention in Vladimir, including spies, saboteurs, terrorists, Trotskyites, Mensheviks, Socialist-Revolutionaries, anarchists, ethnic nationalists, white émigrés, participants in other anti-Soviet organizations, and those with ties to any anti-Soviet or enemy activities. The last official name of the prison was "Vladimir special prison of the MGB of the USSR".

After the dissolution of the Soviet Union, the prison became a regular detention facility. In 1996, a museum about Vladimir Prison was opened on the prison grounds.

Vladimir Prison is currently the largest prison by capacity in Russia, with a capacity for a maximum of 1220 detainees. It is set to be surpassed by Kresty 2 currently under construction in Kolpino, Saint Petersburg.

Popular culture
Vladimir Prison is the subject of the songs Jewish Prisoner and Vladimir Central by the singer-songwriter Mikhail Krug.

Notable inmates
 Vasily Dzhugashvili, son of Joseph Stalin.
 Jan Stanisław Jankowski, Polish politician.
 Paul Ludwig Ewald von Kleist, German field marshal.
 Johan Laidoner, Estonian commander-in-chief of the Estonian Army.
 Yosef Mendelevitch, Jewish Refusenik dissident.
 Aleksei Navalny, Russian opposition politician 
 Garegin Nzhdeh, Armenian general and Dashnak revolutionary activist.
 Francis Gary Powers, American pilot, shot down in a U2 spy plane on 1 May 1960, imprisoned here until February 1962. 
 Mečislovas Reinys, Lithuanian Roman Catholic bishop.
 Natan Sharansky, Jewish Refusenik dissident. 
 Klymentiy Sheptytsky, archimandrite of the Ukrainian Greek Catholic Church.
 Serhiy Yefremov, Ukrainian socialist federalist.
 Dušan Letica, Serbian fascist politician.
 Stepan Maximovich Petrichenko, Russian Anarchist, head of the Kronstadt Rebellion
 Andras Toma, a Hungarian soldier taken prisoner by Red Army in 1945, and remained in detention until 2000.

References

Prisons in Russia
Prisons in the Soviet Union
Buildings and structures in Vladimir, Russia
1783 establishments in the Russian Empire
Objects of cultural heritage of Russia of regional significance
Cultural heritage monuments in Vladimir Oblast